Lives of the Sophists may refer to:

 a book by Eunapius
 a book by Philostratus

See also
 Lives and Opinions of Eminent Philosophers